Maryam Mohammad Yousif Farhat, or Mariam Farahat (24 December 1949 – 17 March 2013), popularly known as Umm Nidal, "the mother of Nidal",  or "Khansa of Palestine", was a Palestinian politician, member of parliament in the Palestinian Legislative Council, and one of Hamas' candidates elected in the 2006 Palestinian legislative election. The word "Nidal" in Arabic is a term, meaning "struggle", "effort" or "work". She was one of the prominent Islamist female leaders in Palestine.

Early life
She was born in Shuja'iyya neighborhood in Gaza City on 24 December 1949.

Khansa of Palestine
She became known as "Khansa of Palestine", the nickname came from  Al-Khansa (one of the companions of prophet Muhammad), all four of whose sons were killed in the Battle of Qadisiyah. Umm Nidal got this title because of her great sacrifices - as in the Palestinian and Islamic culture - during the Second Intifada and before that, where her house was home to many prominent leaders of Izz ad-Din al-Qassam Brigades, especially Emad Akel, who was assassinated in her home in 1993 by the Israel Defense Forces.

Children
She attracted public attention after being filmed advising her 17-year-old son, Muhammad Farhat, for his March 2002 suicide bombing against Israeli citizens. After entering the Gaza Strip former settlement of Atzmona, opening fire and throwing hand grenades at Israeli students enrolled in a pre-military school where they were studying to become army officers, killing five and wounding 23 others, he was shot dead. Upon hearing of her son's death, she proclaimed "Allahu Akbar!" and gave out boxes of halva and chocolates. Her eldest son, Nidal, was killed in February 2003 by bombs planted by Israeli intelligence. A third son, Rawad, died in 2005 in an Israeli airstrike on his car carrying Qassam rocket.

Attitude toward murder of civilians
In an interview published in both the Israeli Arab weekly Kul al-Arab and the London-based Arabic-language daily Al-Quds Al-Arabi, Umm Nidal said she was proud of her sons. In her December 2005 interview, Umm Nidal said:
"I protect my sons from defying Allah, or from choosing a path that would not please Allah. This is what I fear, when it comes to my sons. But as for sacrifice, Jihad for the sake of Allah, or performing the duty they were charged with - this makes me happy."

"They are all occupiers. Besides, don't forget that they all serve in the army. They are all considered soldiers. They are all reserve soldiers."

"They are all occupiers, and we must fight them by any legitimate means."

"All means are legitimate as long as the occupation continues." 

"There is no difference. This is Islamic religious law. I don't invent anything. I follow Islamic religious law in this. A Muslim is very careful not to kill an innocent person, because he knows he would be destined to eternal Hell. So the issue is not at all simple. We rely on Islamic religious law when we say there is no prohibition on killing these people."

"The word 'peace' does not mean the kind of peace we are experiencing. This peace is, in fact, surrender and a shameful disgrace. Peace means the liberation of all of Palestine, from the Jordan River to the Mediterranean Sea. When this is accomplished - if they want peace, we will be ready. They may live under the banner of the Islamic state. That is the future of Palestine that we are striving towards."

Death
Farhat died on 17 March 2013, aged 64, from multiple organ failure, in Gaza. Her funeral was attended by 4,000 Palestinians and Hamas leader Ismail Haniyeh.

References

External links

An Interview with the Mother of a Suicide Bomber, 19 June 2002 interview, Al-Sharq Al-Awsat (MEMRI)
Maryam Farhat aka Umm Nidal dies, 17 March 2013

1949 births
2013 deaths
Hamas members
Muslim Brotherhood women
Palestinian women in politics
People from Gaza City
Members of the 2006 Palestinian Legislative Council